Bernard Duprat (born Bayonne, 17 July 1943) is a former French rugby union player. He played as a wing.

Duprat played for Aviron Bayonnais, from 1964/65 to 1977/78. He also played for Anglet Olympique and US Mouguerre.

He had 15 caps for France, from 1965 to 1972, scoring 9 tries, 31 points on aggregate. He played at the Five Nations Championship in 1966, 1967, 1968 and 1972, being a member of the winning side at the 1968 Five Nations Championship, with a Grand Slam. He was the top try scorer at the 1972 Five Nations Championship, with 4 tries.

After finishing his playing career, he became a coach.

References

External links
Bernard Duprat at ESPN

1943 births
Living people
French rugby union players
France international rugby union players
Sportspeople from Bayonne
Rugby union wings
Aviron Bayonnais players
French rugby union coaches